KHKS (106.1 FM) is a Dallas-Fort Worth Metroplex radio station broadcasting a Top 40 (CHR) format, and calling itself "KISS-FM."  It is licensed to Denton, Texas, and is owned by iHeartMedia, Inc.   It is the home of the nationally syndicated Kidd Kraddick Morning Show.  The studios are on Dallas Parkway in Farmers Branch (using a Dallas address).

KHKS has an effective radiated power (ERP) of 100,000 watts, the maximum for most U.S. FM stations.  The transmitter site is on West Belt Line Road in Cedar Hill.

History

Early years
KDNT-FM was established in June 1948 at 106.3 on the FM dial and moved to the current 106.1 frequency in 1962. The station was a simulcast of KDNT (AM) during its early years. KDNT-FM went through a number of different formats during the late 1970s and early 1980s, including a Top 40/oldies hybrid, disco, rock, and country. The station's calls changed to KDDC in 1980, and then to KIXK at the start of 1981. KIXK's format remained country (as "Kix 106") until changing to oldies/classic hits in December 1982.

The first "Kiss" era
In September 1984, KIXK flipped to CHR/Top 40 as Kiss 106 FM, KTKS. At this time, 106.1 was owned by ABC Radio until being purchased by Capital Cities in 1985.

106.1 The Oasis
At Midnight on September 30, 1987, KTKS began stunting with birds chirping and nature sounds. At Noon the same day, the station flipped to New age/Smooth jazz as KOAI "106.1 The Oasis". Gannett Broadcasting acquired KOAI in 1989. In October 1992, Gannett reached a deal with Granum Communications to move the Smooth Jazz format to 107.5 (now KMVK), where they remained until the fall of 2006.

The revived "Kiss FM"

On November 1, 1992, at 1:11 a.m., the CHR/Top 40 format and "Kiss FM" branding were revived as 106.1 Kiss FM with the current KHKS calls. The first song on the revived "Kiss FM" was Wilson Phillips' version of "The Star-Spangled Banner." Gannett would sell the station to Chancellor Broadcasting in April 1997; after a subsequent series of mergers and buyouts, KHKS came under the ownership of San Antonio-based Clear Channel Communications (now iHeartMedia,) in 2000. Since its launch, KHKS has been the flagship station of The Kidd Kraddick Morning Show, which began nationwide syndication in 2001.

From September 7-10, 2010, the station was slightly rebranded to "06.1 Kiss FM" (leaving out the first "1") as part of its $5,000 contest. That same year, KHKS ran a new initiative where they broadcast commercial free every Monday. However, during that time, they've been known to stretch a song out a little by repeating the chorus of a song twice.

From 2005 to 2009, KHKS was the only top 40 station in Dallas/Fort Worth, although it had always been leaning rhythmic since then. From 2009 to 2014, it was competing head-on with Cumulus-owned KLIF-FM, which leaned more adult CHR. In November 2014, KLIF-FM flipped to a classic hip-hop format for the holiday season before flipping to urban contemporary full-time, leaving KHKS as the sole Top 40/CHR station in the Metroplex once again. KHKS, however, regained KLIF-FM as its competitor, as Hot 93.3 has returned to their previous Top 40/CHR format. It also competed with CBS Radio-owned KVIL from October 2016 to November 2017.

KHKS-HD2
106.1-HD2 (HD Radio needed) first launched in 2004 as "Kiss-FM En Espanol", targeting a Hispanic audience with Hispanic Rhythmic format. Then it was jettisoned in favor of Pride Radio in late 2006 with a format intended for the LGBT community. "Pride Radio" was then moved to its sister station KDMX on 102.9-HD2 in favor of "Wild Radio" in early 2008, running "Party Mix" (Rhythmic CHR) music similar to the "Kiss FM" playlist. However, since March 28, 2011, it has been replaced by Pride Radio, marking the format's return to that particular frequency.

Programming

The Kidd Kraddick Morning Show (flagship station)
Celina Martinez
Colt
Matt Holiday
Tino Cochino
Priscilla 
Alek

References

External links 
 Official website
  DFW Radio/TV History's Tribute to KDNT
  DFW Radio Archives
 Kiss FM Playlist
 
FCC History Cards for KHKS

HKS
Contemporary hit radio stations in the United States
Radio stations established in 1948
1948 establishments in Texas
IHeartMedia radio stations